American Journal of Public Health and the Nation's Health was a publication of the American Public Health Association that existed from 1928 to 1970. It was created by the merger of American Journal of Public Health and The Nation's Health. In 1971, the publication split back into its two original distinct publications.

References

Public health journals
Defunct journals of the United States